Roy Lund "Red" Ostergard (May 16, 1896 – January 13, 1977) was a pinch hitter in Major League Baseball. He was born in Denmark, Wisconsin, and attended college at Southwestern University.

In 1921, Ostergard made his major league debut with the Chicago White Sox. He was inserted as a pinch hitter 11 times that summer, hit 4 singles, and scored 2 runs. That was the only time he ever appeared in the majors.

Ostergard then played in the Texas League from 1923 to 1925. He put up good hitting numbers there, batting over .320 all three seasons and hitting a total of 59 home runs. He then spent one year in the Southern Association and one year in the South Atlantic League.

Ostergard died in 1977, in Hemet, California.

References

External links

1896 births
1977 deaths
Chicago White Sox players
Beaumont Exporters players
Galveston Sand Crabs players
Shreveport Sports players
New Orleans Pelicans (baseball) players
Columbia Comers players
Baseball players from Wisconsin
People from Denmark, Wisconsin
Southwestern Pirates baseball players